The word "Kanagawa" may refer to:

Places 
 Kanagawa Prefecture, one of the prefectures in Japan
 Kanagawa-ku, Yokohama, one of the 18 wards in Yokohama City, Japan

People 
, a Japanese surname

See also 
 , a Japanese castle in Mitsu Kanagawa, Okayama Prefecture
 Kanagawa hemolysin, a toxin produced by the bacterium Vibrio parahaemolyticus
 Kanagawa Station (Okayama), a railway station located in Okayama Prefecture
 , a railway station located in Kanagawa-ku, Yokohama
 17683 Kanagawa, a main-belt asteroid discovered in 1997
 Battle of Kanagawa, a battle during the Sengoku period of Japanese history
 , a famous woodblock print by Hokusai
 TV Kanagawa, an independent UHF television station in Japan serving Kanagawa prefecture and parts of the Greater Tokyo Area
 , also sometimes referred to as the Kanagawa Incident, a samurai attack on foreign nationals in Japan in 1862 which resulted in the bombardment of Kagoshima in 1863